is a Zen temple in Dazaifu, Fukuoka Prefecture, Japan. It was founded by Tetsugyū Enshin of the Tōfuku-ji Rinzai school in 1273. Kōmyōzen-ji is celebrated for its karesansui garden, the only example in Kyushu.

See also

Dazaifu Tenman-gū
Kanzeon-ji
Japanese garden

References

External links
 Kōmyōzen-ji homepage (photographs)

Buddhist temples in Fukuoka Prefecture
Gardens in Fukuoka Prefecture
Buildings and structures in Dazaifu, Fukuoka